First Impressions is an American sitcom that aired on CBS from August 27, 1988 to October 1, 1988.

Overview
Brad Garrett stars as Frank Dutton, the owner of an advertising agency in Omaha, Nebraska who does impressions to sell his commercials.  The show also focuses on Frank's social life as a divorcée starting to date again, and as a father to his nine-year-old daughter, Lindsay.

Eight episodes were filmed, but due to the show accumulating low ratings, the show was cancelled by CBS after airing the first five.

Cast
Brad Garrett as Frank Dutton
Thom Sharp as Dave Poole
Brandy Gold as Lindsay Dutton
Sarah Abrell as Donna Patterson
James Noble as Raymond Voss
Ruth Kobart as Mrs. Madison

Episodes

References

External links

1980s American sitcoms
1988 American television series debuts
1988 American television series endings
CBS original programming
Television shows set in Nebraska